Beniguet or Béniguet may refer to:

Jeanneau Beniguet - a French sailboat design
Île Béniguet - an uninhabited island in the Bréhat archipelago, off the northern coast of Brittany, France
Île de Beniguet - an inhabited island in the Molène archipelago, off the coast of Finistère, France